Bite Me with Dr. Mike is an American television show broadcast on The Travel Channel. It is hosted by Dr. Mike Leahy. The show has eight episodes. The first episode was made available for free in iTunes on June 23, 2009.

Premise
Virologist Dr. Mike Leahy showcases some of  Earth's most dangerous and often tiny creatures that may be a surprise for travelers.  Dr. Leahy will go to the furthest extent to understand these creatures by letting them bite, sting, or feed on his body.  The show premiered on the Travel Channel Tuesday, June 23 at 10 E/P/9 C.

Host
Former motorcycle mechanic of ten years, Mike Leahy, decided to go back to school to pursue his interest in bugs.  Dr Leahy completed his Ph.D in Virology and Molecular Biology while at Oxford University.

Episodes

References

External links
 
 

2009 American television series debuts
English-language television shows
Travel Channel original programming
2009 American television series endings